The House of Peers (Spanish: Estamento de Próceres) was the upper house in the Spanish Cortes between 1834 and 1836. 

The House was created by the Royal Statue of 1834 which created a bicameral parliament with two houses: the House of Peers and the House of Representatives (Estamento de Procuradores). After 1837, the houses of the Cortes Generales were named Senate and Congress of Deputies. 

Members were Grandees.

References 

Defunct upper houses
Government of Spain
 
 
1834 establishments in Spain
1836 disestablishments in Spain